Bernard Bram "Bernt" Schneiders (born 2 April 1959 in Breukelen) is a Dutch politician who is a member of the Partij van de Arbeid (PvdA) and. From July 2006 until September 2016 he was mayor of Haarlem.

Career
Schneiders studied law and worked after he finished his studies for the Queen's Commissioner in the province of North Holland. He became the mayor of Landsmeer in 1995 and served for six years until 2001.

After he finished his term as mayor of Landsmeer, he became the mayor of the town Heemskerk which he served for five years.

On 4 July 2006, Schneiders was appointed the mayor of Haarlem, the capital city of North Holland. He took over the mayoral duties from Jaap Pop. He was succeeded by Jos Wienen in September 2016.

See also
Burgemeester
Haarlem

References

1959 births
Living people
Dutch civil servants
Labour Party (Netherlands) politicians
Mayors of Haarlem
Mayors in North Holland
People from Heemskerk
People from Landsmeer
People from Breukelen